2003-03-29 George M. Holmes Convention Center, Appalachian State University, Boone, NC is a live album by Dave Matthews and Tim Reynolds, and is the ninth volume in the Dave Matthews Band's DMBlive series of download-only concert recordings which are not given unique album titles.  The album was recorded at the George M. Holmes Convocation Center at Appalachian State University in Boone, North Carolina on March 29, 2003.

Track listing

References 

Dave Matthews Band live albums
2009 live albums
Self-released albums